MV Wight Sun is an Isle of Wight ferry built in 2008 for the British company Wightlink.

History
Wight Sun was built at the Brodogradiliste Kraljevica, Croatia and launched on 29 June 2008. After fitting out, she sailed the 3,071 miles to Lymington in March/April 2009 and entered service with Wightlink in spring 2009.

Service

Wight Sun joined the Wight-class fleet on the Yarmouth and Lymington service. Her two sisters, Wight Light and Wight Sky entered service on 25 February 2009. In July 2015, she was transferred to the Portsmouth to Fishbourne route as a relief ferry. Wight Light, which was the relief ferry after St Helen was withdrawn, transferred back to the Lymington to Yarmouth route in its place.

References

External links 

 

Ships of Wightlink
2008 ships